The Liechtenstein Cycling Federation or LRV (in German: Liechtensteiner Radfahrerverband) is the national governing body of cycle racing in Liechtenstein.

The LRV is a member of the UCI and the UEC.

External links
 Liechtenstein Cycling Federation official website

National members of the European Cycling Union
Cycle racing organizations
Cycling
Cycle racing in Liechtenstein